Guhyeshwari Temple, also spelled Guheswari or Guhjeshwari, is one of the revered holy temples in Kathmandu, Nepal. This temple is dedicated to Guhyeshwari or Adi Shakti. The temple is also a Shakti Peetha and it's about 1 km east of Pashupatinath Temple and is located on the southern bank of the Bagmati River. It is said that this temple is the Shakti chair of Pashupatinath Temple. It is an important pilgrimage destination for Hindus, especially for Tantric worshipers. King Pratap Malla renovated this temple in the 17th century. The goddess is also called Guhyekali.

The temple's name originates from the Sanskrit words Guhya (secret, hidden, or cave) and Ishwari (goddess). Literally, the name "Guhyeshwari" stands for the goddess of the cave (गुफाको ईश्वरी) and the origin of the name aligns with the Hindu legend of Sati, her self-immolation when She turns into Adishakti, the Goddess of cosmic energy, at Daksha yagna. In Lalitha Sahasranama the 707th name of the Goddess is mentioned as Guhyarupini (The uncanny form of Goddess intimates that She is beyond human perception, and the invisible location where She resides allows Her to render justice impartially. Another belief is that it is the secret 16th syllable of the Shodashi Mantra) (LS 137th verse: Sarasvati shastramayi| Guhaamba guhyaruupini||).

The main stotras dedicated to goddess are:
 Guhya Kali Sahasranama Stotra, 
 Guhyakali Gadya Sanjeevana Stotram 
 Guhyakali Mahavajra Kavacha Stotram

It is one of the best place nearly to pashupatinath.

The Temple as a Shakti Peeth

The mythology of Daksha yaga and Sati's self immolation had immense significance in shaping ancient Sanskrit literature and even had impact on the culture of India. It led  to the development of the concept of Shakti Peethas, thereby strengthening Shaktism. When Shiva was insulted by his father in law (i.e., Daksha), his wife Sati Devi was so angry that she jumped into the flames of  the yagya (a ritual involving offerings to a sacred fire). Shiva was grief-stricken and picked up her corpse and began to wander about, as her body parts fell to the earth. There are 51 Shakti Peethas which are believed to be enshrined with the presence of Shakti due to the falling of body parts of the corpse of Sati Devi, when Lord Shiva carried it and wandered throughout Aryavartha in sorrow. The 51 Shakti Peethas also correspond to 51 letters of the Sanskrit alphabet. One view is that Guhyeshwari Temple marks the spot where Sati's hips or hind part is said to have fallen. The term guhya is often mistaken as referring to vagina. The genitals of Sati Devi is said to have fallen at another Shakti Peeth worshiped by the name "Kamarupa-Kamakhya" in Assam. Another version is that Guhyeshwari Temple marks the place where both the knees of the goddess is said to have fallen. Each Shakti Peeth is dedicated to a Shakti and a  Kalabhairava. In Guhyeshwari Temple, the Shakti is Mahashira and the Bhairava is Kapali. The goddess is worshiped at the centre of the temple in a kalasha (water jar) that is covered with a layer of silver and gold. The kalasha rests on a stone base which covers an underground natural water spring, from which water oozes out from the edges of the base. The temple stands at the centre of a courtyard and is topped with four gilded snakes that support the finial roof. This temple is revered by Tantric practitioners, and Tantric rites are performed in this temple. The temple is also mentioned in the Kali tantra, Chandi tantra, and Shiva tantra Rahasya and is regarded as one of the most important places for gaining the power of tantra. The Vishwasorup of goddess Guhyeshwari shows her as a many and different coloured headed goddess with innumerable hands. The temple gets much crowded during Dashain and Navaratri.

Vajrayana Buddhism
Newari Vajrayana Buddhists consider Guhyeshwari to be sacred to Vajrayogini in the form of Vajravarahi and to be the location of root of the mythical lotus upon which Swayambhunath stupa rests, which is also the umbilical cord that nurtures Kathmandu. In Tibetan language, the place is called Pag-mo Ngal-chu (Varahi's womb fluid). The water which flows from the spring in the well of the temple is believed to be vaginal discharge, likely amniotic fluid, or waters of Vajravarahi.

References

Hindu temples in Kathmandu District
Parvati temples
Vajrayogini temples
Pashupatinath Temple
17th-century establishments in Nepal